Lars Nielsen may refer to:
 Lars Nielsen (engineer) (born 1955), Swedish engineer
 Lars Nielsen (rower) (born 1960), Danish rower

See also
 Lars Arendt-Nielsen (born 1958), professor at Aalborg University
 Lars Fjeldsoe-Nielsen (born 1973), Danish-Portuguese venture capitalist
 Lars Nilsson (disambiguation)